Walter Steidl (August 28, 1957)  is an Austrian politician (SPÖ) and has been a deputy of the Salzburger Landtag since 1999. He was chairman of the SPÖ-Landtagsfraktion from 2007–2009.

Steidl graduated from an Electrician apprenticeship in 1972 and continued practicing his profession until 1978. In the period from 1983 to 1984 he graduated from the Social Academy in Vienna and since July 2003 has been director of the Gewerkschaft der Privatangestellten (Union of salaried employees), printing, journalism and paper  (GPA-djp) Salzburg. Previously, he was secretary of the GPA. Since 1995, Steidl was a deputy in the Salzburger Landtag and committee speaker for the labor market, Energy and Sports. On September 18, 2012 he was nominated to succeed Cornelia Schmidjell as Minister of Social affairs in the Landesregierung Burgstaller II on October 3, 2012. After the resignation of Gabi Burgstaller as a result of the Landtagswahl in Salzburg 2013, in which the SPÖ suffered a great loss, he took his position as chairman of SPÖ Salzburg.

Steidl is married and a father of four children

References

External links 
 Walter Steidl On the Salzburger Landtags website

Social Democratic Party of Austria politicians
1957 births
Living people